Afghanistan participated at the 2018 Asian Para Games which was held in Jakarta, Indonesia from 6 to 13 October 2018.

See also
 Afghanistan at the 2018 Asian Games

References

Nations at the 2018 Asian Para Games
2018 in Afghan sport